Anna Valesi (born 9 June 2002) is an Italian pair skater. With her skating partner, Manuel Piazza, she has won four senior international medals, including silver at the 2022 Bavarian Open.

Career

Early years 
Valesi began learning to skate in 2006. As a singles skater, she competed internationally in the junior ranks from March 2018 through March 2019.

Skating in partnership with Filippo Clerici, she took silver in the pairs event at the Italian Junior Championships in April 2021.

2021–22 season 
In the 2021–22 season, Valesi began competing in the senior ranks with Manuel Piazza. Making their international debut, Valesi/Piazza took bronze at the Tayside Trophy in November 2021. The following month, they placed fourth at the Italian Championships.

In January 2022, Valesi/Piazza were awarded silver medals at two events – the Icelab International Cup and Bavarian Open.

2022–23 season 
In September 2022, Valesi/Piazza won bronze at the Lombardia Trophy and placed seventh at the 2022 CS Nebelhorn Trophy. In October, they were invited to their first Grand Prix event, the 2022 Skate America, where they finished fifth. They were seventh at the 2022 Grand Prix of Espoo.

Programs 
with Piazza

Competitive highlights 
GP: Grand Prix; CS: Challenger Series

Pair skating with Piazza

Pair skating with Clerici

Single skating

References

External links 
 
 

2002 births
Italian female pair skaters
Living people
Sportspeople from Como